(in English, The Stag King) is an opera in three acts by Hans Werner Henze to a German libretto by  after Il re cervo, a theatrical fable (1762) by Carlo Gozzi. He revised it as Il re cervo, premiered in 1963 at the Staatstheater Kassel.

Performance history
 was first performed in a drastically shortened version by the Städtische Oper Berlin on 23 September 1956 in the Theater des Westens with staging by Jean-Pierre Ponnelle and conducted by Hermann Scherchen as a highlight of the Berliner Festwochen 1956.

This version was also produced at the Santa Fe Opera on 4 August 1965. The complete, original form of König Hirsch was given for the first time on 5 May 1985 at the Staatsoper Stuttgart.

Roles

Synopsis
The king, who has been cast into the forest as a child by the governor, returns to his kingdom. However he is tricked by the governor and forced to go back to the forest where he turns into a stag. Eventually he goes back once again, the governor is killed, and he is transformed again into human form.

Instrumentation
 Woodwinds: 3 flutes (3rd doubling on piccolo), 2 oboes, English horn, 2 clarinets, bass clarinet, 2 bassoons, contrabassoon
 Brass: 4 horns, 3 trumpets (3rd doubling on piccolo trumpet in C [ad lib.]), 2 trombones, tuba
 Percussion (7 players): triangle, tubular bells, suspended cymbals, pair of cymbals, tamtam, 3 tom-toms, tambourine, snare drum, military drum, bass drum (with or without cymbals), claves, maracas, legno, Gegenschlagstöcke, rumba bells, glockenspiel, xylophone
 Other: harp, piano, celesta, organ (ad lib.), harpsichord, accordion, guitar, mandolin
 On-stage band: flute, clarinet, 4 horns, 3 trumpets; percussion: triangle, small bells, tubular bells, suspended cymbals, pair of cymbals, tambourine, 2 snare drums, military drum, bass drum; glockenspiel, vibraphone, mandolin, celesta, organ, violin

Recordings
To date the opera has not been recorded in its entirety. An excerpt (act 3, scene 5) from a performance recorded by the Südwestrundfunk Stuttgart in 1985 (soprano; John Bröcheler, bass-baritone; Helmut Holzapfel, tenor-buffo; Würtembergisches Staatsorchester Stuttgart; Dennis Russell Davies, conductor) is included as part of:
Neue Harmonien: Oper 1948–1962. CD recording, one disc. RCA Red Seal BMG Ariola Classics 74321 73539 2. Musik in Deutschland, 1950–2000: Musiktheater: Oper, Operette, Musical. [Germany]: BMG Ariola Classics, RCA Red Seal, Deutscher Musikrat, 2002.

References

External links
 Work details, score, Schott Music

Operas
German-language operas
Operas by Hans Werner Henze
1956 operas
Operas based on works by Carlo Gozzi